The Salt Lake Stock and Mining Exchange Building in Salt Lake City, Utah, is a 2-story Classical Revival building designed by John C. Craig and constructed in 1909. The sandstone, brick, and cement building includes four large Ionic columns supporting a pediment above a denticulated cornice, and the pedimental imagery is reflected in lintels above the six central door and window fenestrations. The building was added to the National Register of Historic Places in 1976. It is also a contributing resource in the Exchange Place Historic District.

The Salt Lake Stock and Mining Exchange Building was constructed on a site donated by Samuel Newhouse in 1908. Newhouse intended to develop a major financial center that would rival other exchanges in larger cities, and some members of the Salt Lake financial community did not support a shift from the 19th century roots of the exchange. During construction of the new exchange building, a competing exchange was organized and operated briefly in the Atlas Block (demolished) under the name, Utah Stock and Mining Exchange. The Salt Lake Stock and Mining Exchange occupied its new building from 1909 until the exchange became defunct in 1986. In 1972 the exchange was renamed the Intermountain Stock Exchange.

References

External links

		
National Register of Historic Places in Salt Lake City
Neoclassical architecture in Utah
Buildings and structures completed in 1909